Tabua Cakacaka is a Fijian former professional rugby league footballer. His position is prop/second row. He left Fiji at the age of 17 years when he was scouted by the South Sydney Rabbitohs. Since then he has held professional contracts in Australia, France and England.

Tabua was well know for scoring a brilliant try in the 2000 World Cup against Australia barnstorming over Steve Renouf.

Tabua finished his career with the Cootamundra Bulldogs we’re he stuck up a great relationship with his house mate Matt Forsyth.

Playing career
In 2000 he played for Cootamundra in the Group 9 Rugby League competition.

Cakacaka played for the Gateshead Thunder in England, where he co-captained the team in 2008 to become Championship 1 winners. He was also prominent when the 2009 team set a record for reaching the quarter finals in the Challenge Cup. Previous clubs are SM Pia XIII (Elite Championship, France), Newtown Jets (Australia), Canberra Raiders (NRL, Australia), Cootamunda (Australia), South Sydney Rabbitohs (Australia), and Young RL (Australia).

Hunslet Hawks (England), where he helped the team become the championship 1 winners in the 2010 season.

Playing for Cootamundra Bulldogs in the Group Nine 2013 competition in Australia.

Representative career

He represented Fiji in the 2000 World Cup where he scored one of two tries against eventual winners Australia (Lote Tuqui scored the other). He also set the record as the first try scorer against an unbeaten Australia in 2000.

He represented Fiji in the World Sevens in Sydney in 2003 and captained the Fiji A side to a victory against Malta in 2004. He was named in the Fiji training squad for the 2008 Rugby League World Cup but did not make the final squad.

References

External links
Gateshead Thunder profile

1977 births
Living people
Baroudeurs de Pia XIII players
Fijian rugby league players
Fiji national rugby league team players
Expatriate sportspeople in England
Expatriate sportspeople in France
Hunslet R.L.F.C. players
I-Taukei Fijian people
Newtown Jets NSW Cup players
Newcastle Thunder captains
Newcastle Thunder players
York City Knights players
Rugby league props
Rugby league hookers